Tudhaliya II (also Tudhaliya III; Hurrian name Tasmi-Sarri) was a king of the Hittite empire (New kingdom) c. 1380–1370 BC (middle chronology) or 1360? – 1344 BC (short chronology). He was the son of King Arnuwanda I and Ašmu-nikal.

Tudhaliya II also had a Hurrian name Tasmi-Sarri, in common with many other Hittite kings of that time, who also had Hurrian names. His queen was Tadu-Heba, which is also a Hurrian name. Their wedding ceremony is mentioned in many tablets from Sapinuwa, as well as from Hattusa.

Life 
The Hittite empire suffered serious losses of territory during Tudhaliya's reign, with even the capital itself being burnt down.  But, under the able guidance of Tudhaliya's son, the future Suppiluliuma I, the Hittites began to make a recovery while Tudhaliya reigned.

The proper numbering of the Hittite rulers who bore the name Tudhaliya is problematic. There was a Hattian era figure who bore the name Tudhaliya who may or may not have ruled as king. Other reconstructions insert a Tudhaliya directly after Muwatalli I, but before the more famous ruler frequently credited with founding the Empire. The Tudhaliya discussed in this article will be generally found as either "the second" or "the third".

See also

 History of the Hittites

References

External links
Reign of Tudhaliya II (Tudhaliya III at this link)

Hittite kings
14th-century BC people

ru:Тудхалия II